The Palace of Duques de Pastrana (Spanish: Palacio de los Duques de Pastrana) is a palace located in Madrid, Spain. It was declared Bien de Interés Cultural in 1979.

References 

Duques de Pastrana
Bien de Interés Cultural landmarks in Madrid
Buildings and structures in Chamartín District, Madrid